The Patriots was an Australian television drama mini-series. A period-drama, it aired for 10 episodes on ABC in 1962.

This was among a series of period dramas produced by the broadcaster, being preceded by Stormy Petrel (1960) and The Outcasts (1961), and followed by The Hungry Ones (1963). The first two had been written by Rex Rienits but this one was written by Phillip Grenville Mann.

The cast included James Condon as William Charles Wentworth, who gets into trouble while running a newspaper called The Australian (note: no relation to the current newspaper of the same name).

Telerecordings (also known as kinescope recordings) of the episodes are held by National Archives of Australia.

Premise
William Wentworth runs a newspaper which brings him into conflict with Governor Darling.

Cast
James Condon as William Charles Wentworth
Allan Trevor as Governor Ralph Darling
Nigel Lovell as Dr Robert Wardell	
Beverley Phillips as Sarah Cox	
Beryl Marshall as Elizabeth Cox
Marion Johns as Mrs Cox
Ken Goodlet 
Atholl Fleming 
Alistair Duncan as Captain Robinson
Ellis Irving as William Dumraresq, brother of Darling's wife	
Ruth Cracknell 
Barry Creyton 
Richard Davies as Attorney-General Moore.
Ellis Irving as Henry Dumraresq

Episodes

Ep 1 – 27 May (Syd), 10 June (Mel)
Ep 2 – 3 June (Syd), 17 June (Melb) – Wentworth becomes involved in a breach of promise suit
Ep 3 – 10 June (Syd) 24 June (Melb) "The Governor Acts" – Wentworth protests against "rubber stamp" governorship
Ep 4 – 17 June (Syd) 2 July (Melb)
Ep 5 – 24 June (Syd) 9 July (Melb) – "Full scale war"
Ep 6 – 1 July (Syd) 15 July (Melb) – "Pistol Duel" – a duel is fought between William Dumrareq and Robert Wardell
Ep 7 – 8 July (Syd), 22 July (Melb) – "A Marriage in Sydney" – Sarah marries William
Ep 8 – 15 July (Syd) 29 July (Melb) – "A Court Martial"
Ep 9 – 22 July (Syd) 5 Aug (Melb) Darling's answer to Wentworth's impeachment is to hold an official inquiry to the deatg of Private Sudds
Ep 10–29 July (Syd) 21 Aug (Melb) – final ep

Production
In January 1962 the ABC announced it would make a third historical series, an unofficial sequel to Stormy Petrel and The Outcasts. The first two were written by Rex Rienits but this one was written by Phillip Grenville Mann, an Australian who had worked in London and replaced Rienits as drama editor at the ABC.  "I hope that any factions in it are not dubbed 'goodies' and 'baddies'," said Mann. "When men of principle disagree it does not necessarily follow that they become either heroes or scoundrels. Tragedy – and drama – can sometimes be found in men who act which absolute integrity and in direct conflict with the needs and desires of the people."

Designer Phil Hickie spent four months designing 17 sets, plus the costumes and props. More than 200 gallons of paint were used.

The series aired in June.

Reception
The Australian Women's Weekly said she "thought "The Patriots" was a wonderful story that could have had added excitement if it had been played at a quicker pace. I wish it had been done in five one-hour episodes."

References

External links
The Patriots at IMDb

Australian drama television series
1962 Australian television series debuts
1962 Australian television series endings
Australian Broadcasting Corporation original programming
Black-and-white Australian television shows
English-language television shows
Period television series
Television shows set in colonial Australia